Saryshevo (Harış) is a rural locality (a village) and the administrative centre of Saryshevsky Selsoviet, Meleuzovsky District, Bashkortostan, Russia. The population was 406 as of 2010. There are 4 streets.

Geography 
Saryshevo is located 39 km southeast of Meleuz (the district's administrative centre) by road. Alexandrovka is the nearest rural locality.

References 

Rural localities in Meleuzovsky District